Béatrice Guéry-Besnard (born 13 May 1956) is a French former professional tennis player.

Guéry featured as a wildcard in the singles main draw of the 1983 French Open and was beaten in the first round by the ninth-seeded Virginia Ruzici. This was her only experience at the top level and she retired from the tour at a young age due to knee injuries. She played collegiate tennis for Wake Forest University, earning All-ACC selection in 1989.

References

External links
 
 

1956 births
Living people
French female tennis players
Wake Forest Demon Deacons women's tennis players